Miguel Cuaderno Sr. (December 12, 1890 – January 14, 1975) was the 17th Finance Secretary of the Philippines under Manuel Roxas and the first Governor of the Central Bank of the Philippines from 1949 to 1960.

Biography 
Don Miguel was born in Manila on December 12, 1890. His parents were Protacio Cuaderno of Manila and Francisca Rey Hipolito Pascual of Balanga. He grew up in the ancestral home of the Pascuals in Talisay, Balanga. Cuaderno finished his Commerce course from the Liceo de Manila, and his Law degree from the Philippine Law School as valedictorian. He passed the Bar examinations in 1919 as second placer. While employed as professional lecturer of Law at the Philippine Law School and lecturer in banking and finance at the Far Eastern University and University of the East (1922-1937), he also undertook special studies in monetary theory and central banking in the United States and England.

In 1934, he became a member of the Committee of “Seven Wise Men” which included Felimon Sotto, Norberto Romualdez, Manuel Roxas, Vicente Singson, Manuel Briones and Conrado Benitez who drafted the 1935 Philippine Constitution. He was among the members of the Philippine delegation that traveled to the United States to submit the constitution to President Franklin D. Roosevelt for certification under the provisions of the Philippine Independence Act. While in the US, he was admitted to the practice of Law in Washington, D.C. (1935).

He was made a member of the board, then acting general manager and later executive vice president of the Philippine National Bank until 1936. Thereafter, he served as chairman of the board of directors of the International Stock Exchange until 1938. Consequently, he served as first president of the Philippine Bank of Commerce. From June 1946 until December 1948, he served as Secretary of Finance under President Manuel A. Roxas. He was also a member of the National Economic Council (1946-1960) and chairman of the Economic Commission for Asia and the Far East (ECAFE) starting in 1948.

It was President Elpidio Quirino (1948-1953) who appointed Cuaderno as first governor of the Central Bank of the Philippines. He served for 12 years (1948-1959) under three presidents -- Quirino, Ramon Magsaysay (1953-1957) and Carlos P. Garcia (1957-1961). In 1953, he was appointed by the Secretary-General of the United Nations as member of a committee which drew up plans for the establishment of a special fund for the financing of economic development of underdeveloped countries (SUNFED). In 1957, he was elected chairman of the Board of Governors of the International Monetary Fund, International Bank for Reconstruction and Development, and the International Finance Corporation. Upon his suggestion, businessman Eugenio Lopez Sr. bought the Meralco from an American multinational corporation.

On May 1, 1970, he was engaged by the Asian Development Center to draft an agreement among eight Asian countries for the organization of the Asian Payment Union which made possible the use in said countries of their respective national currencies, thereby promoting trade among them. In 1971, he was elected as member of the 1971 Constitutional Convention. Don Miguel Cuaderno was married to Mercedes Martin. He had nine children. He passed away on January 14, 1975.

References

Governors of the Bangko Sentral ng Pilipinas
1890 births
1975 deaths
Secretaries of Finance of the Philippines
Quirino administration cabinet members
Roxas administration cabinet members
Garcia administration personnel
Magsaysay administration personnel